The Metro Conference men's basketball tournament was the conference championship tournament in men's basketball for the Metro Conference. The tournament was held annually between 1976 and 1996, when the Metro Conference was absorbed into Conference USA in 1996.

The winner of the tournament was guaranteed a spot in the NCAA basketball tournament each year.

Tournament champions by year

Championships by school

Television coverage

See also
Metro Conference Men's Basketball Player of the Year

References

1992–93 Metro Conference Men's Basketball media guide
2008–09 Louisville Cardinals Men's Basketball Media Guide